The Adelphi Bank Building is a 19th-century Grade II* listed former bank located in Liverpool, England. Completed in 1892 for the now defunct Adelphi Bank the building's architecture has been described as a mixture of  French European Renaissance with Nordic and Eastern European themes. At present the ground floor serves as a branch of coffee house Caffè Nero.

Doors
The building's bronze doors were designed by Thomas Stirling Lee and depicts scenes of male friendship for history and mythology.

References

Grade II* listed buildings in Liverpool